Tilga Landscape Conservation Area is a nature park which is located in Hiiu County, Estonia.

The area of the nature park is 40 ha.

The protected area was founded in 1998 to protect the pine forest on coastal ridge and its biodiversity. The area is located near Emmaste.

References

Nature reserves in Estonia
Geography of Hiiu County